Helicostyla nobilis is a species of medium-sized, air-breathing land snail, a terrestrial pulmonate gastropod mollusk in the family Camaenidae. 

This species can be found in the Philippines.

References

External links
 Reeve L.A. (1848-1850). Monograph of the genus Bulimus. In: Conchologia Iconica, vol. 5. 
 Hidalgo, J. G. (1896). Catalogue de espèces du genre Cochlostyla, Férussac, que vivent dans les Iles Philippines. Journal de Conchyliologie. 44: 237-353
 Hidalgo, J. G. (1896). Observations sur quelques Cochlostyla des Philippines. Journal de Conchyliologie. 44: 5-46
 Hidalgo, J. G. (1891-1904). Obras malacológicas. Estudios preliminares sobre la fauna malacológica de las Islas Filipinas. Atlas. Memorias de la Real Academia de Ciencias Exactas, Físicas y Naturales de Madrid, Madrid. 170 pls
 Hidalgo, J. G. (1887). Recherches conchyliologiques de M. Quadras aux ȋles Philippines. Journal de Conchyliologie. 35: 37-58, 93-192, pls. 2-7

nobilis
Gastropods described in 1848